Bert de Jong (1956 – 13 August 2013) was a Dutch rally driver. De Jong started racing in 1986 and he won the Dutch championship in 1995 and 1996 with a Ford Escort RS Cosworth. De Jong then changed to a Subaru Impreza WRC and started racing in Europe. He finished first during four rally's counting for the European Rally Championship, twice the Rally Hellendoorn and once the Rally Croatia and Rally Andorra. In 1999 he was involved in a severe crash in Croatia. He quit rally in 2000. In 2009 De Jong returned to rallying and in 2012 he drove the Mitsubishi Lancer WRC05 of the team of his son Bob. On 13 August 2013 he died after a long struggle with cancer.

Career results

WRC results

References

1956 births
2013 deaths
Dutch rally drivers
European Rally Championship drivers
Deaths from cancer in the Netherlands